= Shoi Sakaguchi =

Japanese footballer

Personal information
- Full name: Shoi Sakaguchi
- Date of birth: May 7, 1999 (age 27)
- Place of birth: Tokyo, Japan
- Height: 1.75 m (5 ft 9 in)
- Position: Defender

Team information
- Current team: 東京23FC
- Number: 49

Youth career
- FC Tokyo

Senior career*
Years	Team	Apps	(Gls)
2016–	FC Tokyo		
- * Club domestic league appearances and goals

Shoi Sakaguchi (坂口 祥尉, Sakaguchi Shōi; born May 7, 1999) is a Japanese football player. He plays for FC Tokyo.

== Career ==
Shoi Sakaguchi joined FC Tokyo in 2016. On November 5, he debuted in J3 League (v AC Nagano Parceiro).
